Dostonbek Khurshid o'g'li Khamdamov (Uzbek Cyrillic: Достонбек Хуршид ўғли Ҳамдамов; born 24 July 1996) is an Uzbekistani footballer who currently plays for Al-Sailiya, on loan from Pakhtakor Tashkent, as a right or left winger.

Career

Club
On 15 March 2018, Khamdamov was registered by Russian Premier League club Anzhi Makhachkala, taking the #7 jersey after signing an 18-month contract.
On 15 February 2019, Anzhi Makhachkala announced that Khamdamov had left the club to join Pakhtakor Tashkent.

Khamdamov was released by Pakhtakor Tashkent on 13 January 2021. On 23 July 2021, Khamdamov returned to Pakhtakor Tashkent, signing a contract until the end of 2022. On 22 January 2022, Pakhtakor announced that Khamdamov had signed for Al-Sailiya on loan until 30 June 2022.

International
Khamdamov was part of the U-19 squad when they finished in the semi-finals of the 2014 AFC U-19 Championship, where Khamdamov scored one goal only. After that match, Khamdamov would go on to make an outstanding performance in the 2015 FIFA U-20 World Cup, where he scored three goals and produced a magnificent performance as Uzbekistan ran into the quarter-finals before bowing to Senegal. For this performance, he became the first Uzbek player to be nominated as the Asian Young Footballer of the Year.

He participated in the 2016 AFC U-23 Championship and scored two goals, but his team went out from the group stage. Two years later, he would lead Uzbekistan to conquer the country's first-ever U-23 trophy. For this successful display, Khamdamov earned a place and would go to be part of the senior squad for the 2019 AFC Asian Cup.

Career statistics

Club

International

Statistics accurate as of match played 17 November 2020

International goals

Uzbekistan U23

Uzbekistan
Scores and results list Uzbekistan's goal tally first.

Honours

Club
Bunyodkor
 Uzbekistan Super Cup: 2014

International
Uzbekistan U-23
 AFC U-23 Championship (1): 2018
Uzbekistan U-16
 AFC U-16 Championship (1): 2012

Individual
Asian Young Footballer of the Year: 2015

References

1996 births
Living people
Uzbekistani footballers
Uzbekistan international footballers
FC Bunyodkor players
People from Tashkent Region
Association football wingers
FC Anzhi Makhachkala players
Pakhtakor Tashkent FK players
Al-Nasr SC (Dubai) players
Hatta Club players
Al-Sailiya SC players
Russian Premier League players
UAE Pro League players
Qatar Stars League players
Uzbekistani expatriate footballers
Expatriate footballers in Russia
Expatriate footballers in the United Arab Emirates
Expatriate footballers in Qatar
Uzbekistani expatriate sportspeople in Russia
Uzbekistani expatriate sportspeople in the United Arab Emirates
Moroccan expatriate sportspeople in Qatar
Footballers at the 2018 Asian Games
Uzbekistan Super League players
2019 AFC Asian Cup players
Asian Games competitors for Uzbekistan